The South Central Conference is a high school athletic conference in Iowa. Made up of mid-sized 2A and 3A schools, the conference currently has seven members, five of which are based in their respective county seats. Because of the lack of student population in southern Iowa, most of the schools are the lone district in their county, or are flanked only by very small schools. The conference was formed in 1930 by Knoxville, Pella, Indianola High School, West Des Moines Valley, and Winterset.

At the end of the 1995–96 school year, the members were Albia, Centerville, Chariton, Davis County (Bloomfield), Grinnell, Knoxville, Oskaloosa and Pella.

Albia, Centerville, Chariton and Davis County (Bloomfield) reformed the league by adding Eddyville–Blakesburg from the Des Moines River Conference and Clarke (Osceola) from the Little Hawkeye Conference, as Grinnell, Knoxville and Pella left for the Little Hawkeye Conference.

In the 2014 academic school year, Knoxville re-joined from the Little Hawkeye Conference, bringing the total number of teams in the conference to seven.

At the start of the 2022-2023 school year Cardinal (Eldon) joined the conference moving from the Southeast Iowa Superconference.

Members

Former membership

Prairie City Monroe - 1998–2006

Boys Basketball Conference Champions

Girls Basketball Conference Champions

External links
 South Central Conference homepage

References

High school sports in Iowa